The Piano Concerto No. 25 in C major, K. 503, was completed by Wolfgang Amadeus Mozart on December 4, 1786, alongside the Prague Symphony, K. 504. Although two more concertos (No. 26, K. 537 and No. 27, K. 595) would later follow, this work is the last of what are considered the twelve great piano concertos written in Vienna between 1784 and 1786. Chronologically the work is the 21st of Mozart's 23 original piano concertos.

K. 503 is now widely recognized "by common consent" as "one of Mozart's greatest masterpieces in the concerto genre." However, it had long been neglected in favor of Mozart's other "more brilliant" concertos, such as No. 21, K. 467. Though Mozart performed it on several occasions, it was not performed again in Vienna until after his death, and it only gained acceptance in the standard repertoire in the later part of the twentieth century. Mozart's pupil Johann Nepomuk Hummel valued it, as can be seen in the influence it had on Hummel's own Piano Concerto in C, Op. 36.

Music 

The concerto is scored for solo piano, flute, two oboes, two bassoons, two horns in C, two trumpets in C, timpani and strings. It is one of Mozart's longest concertos, with average performance durations of 29–33 minutes.

The concerto has the following three movements:

While the concerto is frequently compared to the Jupiter Symphony, Girdlestone considers its closest parallel to be the String Quintet in C, K. 515. The expansive first movement (in sonata form) is one of Mozart's most symphonic concerto movements. This movement subtly slips in and out of the minor several times. One of the secondary themes of the concerto's first movement is a march that often reminds people of "La Marseillaise". (See e.g. Musical section.) This theme dominates the development section. Beethoven references this concerto in his own Fourth Piano Concerto. In addition, the famous motif in the first movement of Beethoven's Fifth Symphony resembles one found in this concerto. Also, Mozart's 25th and Beethoven's 5th concerti have a strong march-like theme in the first movement that is first played in minor and then soon appears gloriously in major.

The tranquil second movement is in sonata form, but lacks a development section. It extensively uses the winds.

The third movement is a sonata-rondo that opens with a gavotte theme from Mozart's opera Idomeneo. Girdlestone considers this movement to be very serious-minded. Like the first movement, it touches upon the minor; however, it ends assuredly and joyfully.

Critical reception 

In 1798, music critic Johann Friedrich Rochlitz described K.503 as "the most magnificent and difficult of all [Mozart's] hitherto known concertos" and "[maybe] the most magnificent of all the concertos which have ever been written."

According to Simon P. Keefe, K. 503 is now regarded "by common consent one of Mozart's greatest masterpieces in the concerto genre." It is often viewed as a "kindred spirit" or "the rival and the complement" of Mozart's great C minor piano concerto, K. 491, completed a few months prior. Keefe mentions and quotes Donald Tovey, Cuthbert Girdlestone, and Alfred Einstein as among the musicologists who uphold K. 503 as exemplary.

Notes

References 
 
 Kennedy Center program notes: Piano Concerto No. 25 in C major, K. 503

External links 
 
 
 BBC Discovering Music

25
Compositions in C major
1786 compositions